Young Desire may refer to:

 Young Desire (film), a 1930 American drama
 Young Desire (album), a 2007 studio album by the Finnish band Lapko